William "Bill" McLernon (born 1 August 1934) is an Irish equestrian. He competed in two events at the 1972 Summer Olympics.

References

External links
 

1934 births
Living people
Irish male equestrians
Olympic equestrians of Ireland
Equestrians at the 1972 Summer Olympics
Place of birth missing (living people)